Brian Richardson (born 5 October 1934 in Sheffield) was a professional footballer with Sheffield United, Swindon Town and Rochdale.

Richardson signed for Sheffield United in 1954, aged 20, and stayed for 12 years, playing in 291 League matches. He was a ball-winning half-back, often paired with the more creative Gerry Summers.

He went on to play for Swindon and Rochdale; on retiring as a player he became a sales executive.

References

Rochdale A.F.C. players
Sheffield United F.C. players
Swindon Town F.C. players
1934 births
Living people
English footballers
Association football midfielders